Derek Andrew Safo (born 5 September 1982), better known by his stage name Sway or Sway DaSafo, is a British rapper of Ghanaian descent. He is also a producer, having established Dcypha Productions, signed to Island/Universal (label founder). Safo's 2008 track "Black Stars" gave kudos to popular Ghanaians across the diaspora. Sway's first big track, "On My Own" was released under the name Sway DaSafo.

Biography

Early life
Derek Andrews Safo born September 5, 1982 known professionally as Sway (Dasafo) was born and raised in Hornsey, North London by Ghanaian parents Beatrice & Alhaji. He attended Campsbourne Junior School and then Highgate Wood Secondary School, where he would spend many of his lunchtime breaks learning how to produce music in the schools 'backroom' music facility.

His witty punch lines, storytelling ability and fast flow influenced by his favorite rap group Bone Thugs N Harmony and local drum and bass MCs such as Skibadee and Shabba D had him constantly stand out as a unique hybrid.

2006–2007: This Is My Demo
To avoid recognition, Sway began covering his face in pictures with a Union Jack bandana. He started his own record label, Dcypha Productions, a corruption of his surname Dasafo, with DJ Turkish and ‘Jr’ Appiah. He then began writing and producing his first official solo releases, This Is My Promo volumes 1 and 2.

He became the first unsigned rapper to win a MOBO Award prior to the release of an official album. He ultimately decided to release his debut album This Is My Demo independently. It received critical acclaim and, despite a lack of mainstream radio support, sold over 50,000 copies within its first year of release.

The album yielded the Al Shux-produced UK top 40 single "Little Derek", was nominated for the Mercury Music Prize and Sway became the first UK rapper to win a BET Hip Hop Award.

2008–2009: Konvict Music and The Signature LP
Amongst his supporters were international superstars Akon, Lupe Fiasco and Pharrell Williams who had all displayed an interest in signing the UK rapper to their own label imprints.

After months of consideration Sway decided he would become part of Akon's international Konvict Music family alongside the likes of Lady Gaga and T-Pain. 
Akon also embodied the fusion of a West African meets Western approach to music whilst building an empire so he was the perfect case study for Sway.  Sway was often invited to accompany Akon around the world where he networked and built strong relationships, most notably with Dutch super-producer Giorgio Tuinfort (Michael Jackson, David Guetta, Sia) who remains one of Sway's greatest influences and mentors to date.

Sway's second album The Signature LP was released in 2008 through Dcypha Productions. The album included production from Emile Haynie (Eminem, Kid Kudi, Bruno Mars), The Nextmen (Plan B, Public Enemy) as well as Giorgio Tuinfort. This album was recognized for tracks such as "F UR X" which was a smash UK club record and the international door breaker "Silver & Gold" featuring Akon.

2010–2012: 3 Beat Records, Still Speedin’ and Level Up
Sway often utilized his ability to attract some of the world's greatest talents. He frequented talent competitions where he first came across a unique ginger haired singer/songwriter who he would then invite to his home and record songs with, they became friends and shortly after this period that person became known as the world renowned Ed Sheeran. After overcoming some health issues  Sway decided it was time to release new music, he signed a singles deal with 3 Beat Records via Universal which saw Sway's first release on the label "Still Speedin'" climb up the National official UK charts a land Sway his first top 20 hit. The song was well received and even received social media support from the likes of racing legends Nigel Mansell and Lewis Hamilton who were both mentioned in the song  

Sway's vast array of collaborations go from recording and writing with acts such as Mark Ronson and Childish Gambino to award-winning verses for Ghanaian super stars Sarkodie and Edem. 
He was also the only other rapper to be featured on Lupe Fiasco's US Billboard number 1 album "Lasers" released in 2011. Sway's next single "Level Up", written with Flux Pavilion (Kanye West, Jay Z) during his University student days, became Sway's highest-charting single to date landing at number 8 on the UK Singles Chart.

2013–2016: Dcypha Productions and Island Records
In 2013, Sway decided he wanted to return to his original plan of building a label and curating talent. Through his search he came across south London rapper/singer Tiggs Da Author, who he took under his wing and signed to his revived Dcypha Productions label as well as signing YouTube star KSI.

He featured both new artists on his EP Wake Up his final release on 3beat records. The title track of the EP was produced by former Radio 1 DJ Zane Lowe and the track ‘Back Someday’ featured vocals from Ed Sheeran.
 
In 2014 the Dcypha team oversaw the signing of Tiggs Da Author to Sony RCA and subsequently in July 2015, Dcypha Productions became an imprint of Island Records/Universal Music Group. KSI became the first artist to be up-streamed.

In the same year Sway released a long-awaited third album entitled Deliverance, which describes as “an affirmation of my intentions”. The album was released with no lead singles or videos, as Sway wanted it to serve its true purpose as “a project to be discovered”.
The album would mark the first time that Sway would discuss his musical journey and previous health issues publicly, in hope that it will encourage and inspire people who face similar adversities. He also talks about becoming a father to his first child, Jalil.

The Dcypha roster continued to flourish and went on to sign acts such as singer/songwriter Sam Garrett,  Battle rap champion Lunar C and British & Asian R&B star Arjun. 
As a writer and producer Sway amassed over a billion music streams worldwide across platforms such as YouTube, Spotify, Apple Music and he continues to work with emerging talent as well as accomplished creatives to push musical boundaries forward.

2017–2018: New Reign Productions
Dcypha Productions parted ways with Island Records in 2017 and Sway decided to focus on building New Reign Productions whilst maintaining his role as executive producer for KSI and Tiggs Da Author. He later oversaw the signing of Tiggs to the newly formed Alacran music label and established KSI as an independent music artist by releasing his Space EP independently.

New Reign Productions houses a stable of music producers, graphic designers, directors, songwriters and other creative minds. As a group they are set to release an array of singles in the near future.

2017 also saw the birth of Sway's second child Ammar-Joseph. The birth of his sons inspired him to put together two new albums Songs From The Stash and Stories From The Safe dedicated to them that will be released on both their birthdays in 2019.  It has also been rumored that he is recording an album for his twin daughters (Born 23 December 2018) Queen-Inaya & Queen-Imara entitled Messages From The Mind

2018–present: Next Chapter and New Reign empire
Whilst working on a new album titled ‘Next Chapter’ Sway decided to revert to releasing under his full original artist name ‘Sway Dasafo’.

Discography

Studio albums
 This Is My Demo (2006)
 The Signature LP (2008)
 Deliverance (2015)
 Verses from the Vault (2018)
 Verses from the Vault 2 (2018)
 Songs from the Stash EP (2019)
 Stories from the Safe EP (2021)

Filmography

Awards and nominations

References

External links
 
 Sway interview on LeftLion.co.uk

1982 births
Living people
English male rappers
English record producers
Hip hop record producers
People from Hornsey
Rappers from London
English people of Ghanaian descent
Black British male rappers